Fuyang is a town in Fuchuan Yao Autonomous County, Guangxi, China.

Administrative division
As of 2016, the town is divided into seven communities and eighteen villages:

 Xinyong Community
 Rensheng Community
 Yangshou Community
 Fenghuang Community
 Chengdong Community
 Ma'anshan Community
 Xinjian Community
 Gongtang
 Huoqing
 Tiegeng
 Shawang
 Chaoyang
 Yanggong
 Zhushao
 Chajia
 Xinba
 Mulang
 Shanbao
 Xiping
 Shesan
 Huanglong
 Jiangtang
 Dawei
 Laoxi
 Yangxi

Geography
The Fuchuan River flows north–south through the town.

Economy
The economy of the town is mainly based on agriculture, including farming and breeding. Agricultural crops include: grains, vegetables, navel orange, and Citrus tangerina. Recently, construction, building materials, chemical industry, and smelting. Agricultural and sideline products processing have significantly developed in the town.

Tourist attractions
The town has a public park named "Fenghuangshan Park".

Transportation
The China National Highway G538 passes through the town.

References

Bibliography

Towns of Hezhou